Secret vice may refer to:
Masturbation
A Secret Vice, a lecture given by J. R. R. Tolkien regarding constructed languages